Pyykkönen is a Finnish surname. Notable people with the surname include:

 Samu Pyykkönen (born 1994), Finnish ice hockey player
 Tuulikki Pyykkönen (born 1963), Finnish cross-country skier

Finnish-language surnames 
Surnames of Finnish origin